Robert Hobart, 4th Earl of Buckinghamshire,  (6 May 17604 February 1816), styled Lord Hobart from 1793 to 1804, was a British Tory politician.

Life
Buckinghamshire was born at Hampden House, the son of George Hobart, 3rd Earl of Buckinghamshire and Albinia, daughter of Lord Vere Bertie, younger son of Robert Bertie, 1st Duke of Ancaster and Kesteven. He was educated at Westminster School, London and later served in the American Revolutionary War.

Political career
Buckinghamshire was a Member of Parliament (MP) in the Irish House of Commons for Portarlington from 1784 to 1790 and thereafter for Armagh Borough from 1790 to 1797. He sat also in the British House of Commons for the rotten borough of Bramber in 1788, a seat he held until 1790, and then for Lincoln from 1790 to 1796. He acted as aide-de-camp to successive Lord Lieutenants of Ireland from 1784 onwards, and from 1789 to 1793 he was chief secretary to the Lord Lieutenant, exerting his influence in this country to prevent any concessions to Roman Catholics.

In 1793 he was invested a member of the Privy Council, and appointed Governor of Madras. In 1798 he was recalled to England by the President of the Board of Control responsible for Indian affairs, Henry Dundas and summoned to the House of Lords through a writ of acceleration in his father's junior title of Baron Hobart. In the Lords, he favoured the union between England and Ireland. He was the leader of the House of Lords from March to October 1801. He later served as Secretary of State for War and the Colonies from 1801 to 1804 when it was said he had "a better grasp of the local or colonial conditions, and a more active spirit than did some of his successors." He was Chancellor of the Duchy of Lancaster in 1805 and again in 1812, Postmaster General from 1806 to 1807 and President of the Board of Control, a post for which his time in India suited him, from 1812 to 1816. Hobart, the capital of Tasmania, is named after Lord Buckinghamshire.

Family

Lord Buckinghamshire married firstly Margaretta, daughter of Edmund Bourke, in 1792. They had one son (who died in infancy) and a daughter, Lady Sarah, who married Prime Minister Lord Goderich and was the mother of George Robinson, 1st Marquess of Ripon. After Margaretta's death in 1796, he married secondly the Hon. Eleanor  Eden, daughter of William Eden, 1st Baron Auckland, in 1799. Two years earlier William Pitt the Younger  had broken off what was generally believed to be an informal engagement to Eleanor. There were no children from this marriage. Lord Buckinghamshire died in February 1816 at the age of 55, after a fall from his horse. He was succeeded in the earldom by his nephew, George. Lady Buckinghamshire died in October 1851, aged 74.

References

External links

1760 births
1816 deaths
British MPs 1784–1790
British MPs 1790–1796
British Secretaries of State
Chancellors of the Duchy of Lancaster
4
Irish MPs 1783–1790
Hobart, Robert
Hobart, Robert
Members of the Privy Council of Great Britain
Members of the Privy Council of Ireland
Politics of Lincoln, England
United Kingdom Postmasters General
Robert
Commissioners of the Treasury for Ireland
Chief Secretaries for Ireland
Deaths by horse-riding accident in England
Members of the Parliament of Ireland (pre-1801) for Portarlington
Members of the Parliament of Ireland (pre-1801) for County Armagh constituencies
Leaders of the House of Lords
Presidents of the Board of Control
Governors of Madras